Angus Clifford Racey Helps (1913–1970) was an English children's author and illustrator. His books were written in a simple style and feature woodland creatures and birds, with illustrations by the author. He is known also for illustrating postcards, greeting cards, jigsaw puzzles, playing cards and wrapping paper.

Biography
Helps was born in Bristol on 2 February 1913, to Clifford R. Helps and his wife Dorothy (née Davis), who had married in Cardiff in 1911. He spent his childhood in the hamlet of Chelvey, Somerset. He was privately educated at a vicarage and later at Bristol Cathedral School. Speaking in a 1966 television interview, Helps traced his story-telling back to his schooldays, when he began to write stories for a sick younger cousin. On leaving school he entered the antiquarian book trade and attended the West of England College of Art.

Helps married Irene Orr on 8 April 1936. A daughter, Anne, was born in July 1937, and a son, Julian, in 1949 or 1950. He used to tell his young daughter a bedtime story every night. His first notable success as an author and artist came during World War II with stories written for her. When the war came, Anne was packed off to a less noisy part of the country, but she still insisted on her story, and so Helps wrote them down for her, drew pictures to illustrate them, and sent them on.

During that time, Racey and Irene lived in Shepton Mallet, Somerset, and were hosts to many young American soldiers based in the town, besides running a hairdressing salon. On one occasion a publisher happened to drop in and pick up one of Helps's handwritten, illustrated booklets. Helps was invited to London to discuss publication of future work.

For a while the family lived in Clevedon, Somerset, then moved to Saltford near Bath, and in 1962 on to Barnstaple, Devon, where the scenic countryside provided further inspiration for Helps's pictures.

Racey Helps suffered a fatal heart attack at his Barnstaple home in 1970, at the age of 57.

Publication
Helps's stories were published initially by Collins and later by the Medici Society. He contributed to several children's annuals published by Collins. Much of his work was published also by Rand McNally in the United States, where he illustrated several books written by Helen Wing. At least ten of his picture books appeared in German. At least one appeared in Danish.

Partial bibliography

References

External links
Racey Helps postcard checklist

1913 births
1970 deaths
English children's writers
British children's book illustrators
Writers from Bristol
People from Somerset
Writers from Barnstaple
Writers who illustrated their own writing
Artists from Barnstaple